The Papua New Guinea men's national field hockey team represents Papua New Guinea in international field hockey competitions and is controlled by the Papua New Guinea Hockey Federation.

Results

Oceania Cup
2007 – 
2013 – 
2017 –

Hockey World League
2012–13 – First round
2014–15 – First round
2016–17 – First round

Pacific Games
1979 - 
2015 -

See also

Papua New Guinea women's national field hockey team

References

Oceanian men's national field hockey teams
Field hockey
National team
Men's sport in Papua New Guinea